
Year 24 BC was either a common year starting on Thursday, Friday or Saturday or a leap year starting on Friday (link will display the full calendar) of the Julian calendar (the sources differ, see leap year error for further information) and a common year starting on Thursday of the Proleptic Julian calendar. At the time, it was known as the Year of the Consulship of Augustus and Flaccus (or, less frequently, year 730 Ab urbe condita). The denomination 24 BC for this year has been used since the early medieval period, when the Anno Domini calendar era became the prevalent method in Europe for naming years.

Events 
 By place 

 Roman Empire 
 Caesar Augustus becomes Roman Consul for the tenth time. His partner is Gaius Norbanus Flaccus.
 Augustus founds the city of Nicopolis in Egypt to commemorate his final victory over Mark Antony.
 Herod the Great marries for a third time, to Mariamne II, after a 4-year hiatus from family life (after putting to death his 2nd wife Mariamne I).

Births

Deaths 
 Aulus Terentius Varro Murena, Roman general and politician

References